The following events related to sociology occurred in the 1820s.

1820
Events
Thomas Malthus's Principles of Political Economy is published.

Births
April 27: Herbert Spencer
November 28: Friedrich Engels

Events
Georg Wilhelm Friedrich Hegel's Social Classes is published.

1822
Events
Auguste Comte's Plan of scientific studies necessary for the reorganization of society
G. W. F. Hegel's Elements of the Philosophy of Right

1824
Events
Henri de Saint-Simon's Catéchisme des industriels is published.

1826
Events
Auguste Comte' The Crisis of Industrial Civilization

References 

Sociology
Sociology timelines